Colocasia gigantea, also called giant elephant ear or Indian taro, is a 1.5–3 m tall herb with a large, fibrous corm, producing at its apex a whorl of large leaves. The leaf stalk is used as a vegetable in some areas in South East Asia and Japan.

Known as dọc mùng in Vietnam (bạc hà in some provinces in southern Vietnam), it is often used in canh chua and bún.

In Japanese, it is called hasu-imo (literally, "lotus yam") in general and ryukyu in Kōchi Prefecture as it is originated in Ryukyu Kingdom. It is sometimes used as an ingredient of miso soup, chanpurū and sushi. A Japanese term zuiki means the leaf stalk of both C. gigantea and C. esculenta. Higo-zuiki, made of a dried stalk and produced solely in Kumamoto Prefecture (or Higo Province), is a sex toy with a history of several hundred years, containing saponin which is considered to affect sexual pleasure.

Colocasia gigantea is close to Alocasia macrorrhizos and is thought to be produced from natural crossing between A. macrorrhizos and C. esculenta.

References

Aroideae
Crops originating from Asia
Vietnamese cuisine